Ranuccio Farnese may refer to:

Ranuccio Farnese il Vecchio (1390–1450), grandfather of Pope Paul III
Ranuccio Farnese (1509–1529), son of Pope Paul III
Ranuccio Farnese (cardinal) (1530–1565), grandson of Pope Paul III
Ranuccio I Farnese, Duke of Parma, fourth Duke of Parma and Piacenza (1569–1622)
Ranuccio II Farnese, Duke of Parma, sixth Duke of Parma and Piacenza (1630–1694)

pt:Ranuccio Farnese